Iona Township is the name of some places in the U.S. state of Minnesota:
Iona Township, Murray County, Minnesota
Iona Township, Todd County, Minnesota

See also
Iona Township (disambiguation)

Minnesota township disambiguation pages